Käthi Fritschi (born 18 August 1954) is a Swiss gymnast. She competed at the 1972 Summer Olympics.

References

External links
 

1954 births
Living people
Swiss female artistic gymnasts
Olympic gymnasts of Switzerland
Gymnasts at the 1972 Summer Olympics
Place of birth missing (living people)